The following elections occurred in the year 1946.

Africa
 French legislative election, November 1946 (French Equatorial Africa)
 French legislative election, November 1946 (Guinea)
 1946–1947 Moyen-Congo Representative Council election
 1946 Southern Rhodesian general election
 1946 Ubangi-Shari Representative Council election

Asia
 1946 Philippine general election:
 1946 Philippine presidential election
 1946 Philippine House of Representatives elections
 1946 Philippine Senate election
 1946 Soviet Union legislative election

India
 1946 Indian provincial elections
 1946 Madras Presidency legislative assembly election
 1946 Madras Presidency legislative council election
 1946 Bengal Legislative Assembly election

Europe
 1946 Belgian general election
 Bulgaria: 
 Bulgarian republic referendum, 8 September 1946
 Bulgarian Constitutional Assembly election, 27 October 1946
 1946 Czechoslovakian parliamentary election
 1946 Dutch general election
 Germany: 
 30. June Wahl zur Verfassunggebenden Landesversammlung Württemberg-Baden
 30. June Wahl zur Verfassunggebenden Landesversammlung in Bayern 
 30. June Wahl zur Verfassungsberatenden Landesversammlung in Groß Hessen 
 In September Kommunalwahlen in der Sowjetischen Besatzungszone (SBZ) 
 13. October Bürgerschaftswahl in Bremen 
 13. October in Hamburg
 20. October Landtagswahlen in Soviet occupation zone (Brandenburg, Mecklenburg-Vorpommern, Sachsen, Sachsen-Anhalt and Thüringen) 
 1946 Berlin state election 
 24. November in Württemberg-Baden 
 1. December in Bayern
 1. Dezember in Hessen
 1946 Greek legislative election
 1946 Icelandic parliamentary election
 Italy: 
 1946 Italian constitutional referendum
 1946 Italian general election
 1946 Dutch general election 
 1946 Romanian general election
 1946 Soviet Union legislative election
 1946 Turkish general election

France
 May 1946 French constitutional referendum
 June 1946 French legislative election
 October 1946 French constitutional referendum
 November 1946 French legislative election

United Kingdom
 1946 Aberdare by-election
 1946 Battersea North by-election
 1946 Combined English Universities by-election
 1946 Combined Scottish Universities by-election
 1946 Down by-election
 1946 Glasgow Bridgeton by-election
 1946 Hemsworth by-election
 1946 Kilmarnock by-election
 1946 Ogmore by-election
 1946 Preston by-election

English local
 1946 Manchester Council election

Americas

Canada
 1946 Edmonton municipal election
 1946 Ottawa municipal election
 1946 Toronto municipal election

Mexico
 1946 Mexican general election

Caribbean
 1946 Antigua and Barbuda general election
 1946 Trinidad and Tobago general election

South America 
 1946 Argentine general election
 1946 Chilean presidential election
 1946 Colombian presidential election

United States
 United States House of Representatives elections in California, 1946
 1946 California gubernatorial election
 1946 California's 12th congressional district election
 1946 Maine gubernatorial election
 1946 Minnesota gubernatorial election
 1946 New Orleans mayoral election
 1946 New York state election
 United States House of Representatives elections in South Carolina, 1946
 1946 South Carolina gubernatorial election
 1946 United States House of Representatives elections

United States Senate
 1946 United States Senate elections
 United States Senate election in Massachusetts, 1946

Oceania
 1946 New Zealand general election

Australia

 1946 Australian federal election
 1946 Henty by-election
 1946 Australian referendum
 1946 Tasmanian state election
 1946 Wimmera by-election

See also
 :Category:1946 elections

1946
Elections